Christ Church, High Harrogate is a parish church in the Church of England located in Harrogate, North Yorkshire, England. It was the first church building to be built in Harrogate and is today home to a thriving congregation and  – along with the attached Parish Centre – an important focus of community activities.

History
Christ Church, High Harrogate was the first permanent church building in Harrogate. Originally a chapel of ease to St John's, Knaresborough, the bulk of the present building was erected in 1831 to designs by John Oates (architect) and consecrated as the first parish church in the town. The transepts and chancel were added in 1862 by Henry Francis Lockwood and William Mawson. The carving on the extensions and a previous reredos were executed by Mawer and Ingle in 1862. There have been significant changes to the building in the 1920s (many major internal changes), the 1930s (the installation of the Comper reredos) and the 1980s (the building of the attached parish centre.)

Christ Church has in turn planted a series of other churches across the town including St. Peter's (1870), St Luke's (1898), and St Andrew's Starbeck (1911). Like Christ Church itself, all of these are thriving Christian communities today.

Present day
Christ Church is home to a thriving Christian community of 300+ adults and 170+ children and young people. It stands in the mainstream of the Anglican (Church of England) tradition.

List of Vicars
Perpetual Curates (1755–1831)
1755 – 1759 William Leigh Williamson
1759 – 1765 Nevile Stow
1765 – 1769 John Hinde
1769 – 1825 Robert Mitton
1825 John Lloyd Lugger
1825 – 1831 Thomas Kennion (and see Vicars below)

Vicars (1831–present)
1831 – 1845 Thomas Kennion
1845 – 1858 Thomas Sheepshanks
1858 – 1870 Horatio James (Canon of Ripon)
1870 – 1887 William Winter Gibbon (Canon of Ripon)
1887 – 1903 Richard Wentworth Fawkes
1904 – 1926 Douglas Sherwood Guy (Canon of Ripon)
1927 – 1935 Paul Fulchrand Delacour de Labilliere (subsequently Bishop of Knaresborough and Dean of Westminster)
1935 – 1937 Claude Cyprian Thornton (Canon of Ripon)
1937 – 1943 Martin Kiddle
1943 – 1954 William Frederick Vernon
1954 – 1970 Thomas Arthur Bendelow
1970 – 1994 Richard Thomas Wright McDermid (Chaplain to HM the Queen, Canon of Ripon)
1995 – 2007 John Edward Colston (Canon of Ripon)
2008 – 2014 Nicholas James Henshall
2015 –        Matthew Scott Evans (22 January 2015 – present)

This list is taken directly from the board at the west end of the church and all spellings are as on the board.

Organ
In 1908 a new organ by Norman & Beard was installed. It was rebuilt by John T. Jackson in 1980 with a new detached console. A specification of the organ can be found on the National Pipe Organ Register.

Organist and Director of Music
Mr. Pilkington ca. 1863
Matthew Arnold ca. 1867
John Septimus Dickinson ???? – 1870 (afterwards organist of St. Peter's Church, Harrogate)
W.P. Bell ca. 1880
Mr. Wade ca. 1892
J.F. Chubb 1910 – ????
Ernest Farrar ARCO 1912 – 1916
Warner Yeomans ca. 1920
Douglas Robinson 1946 – 1974?
Ralph Franklin FTCL FGSM ca. 1980s
Derek Bolton 1980's
Dr John Beilby BMus PhD FLCM LRAM LTCL 2005 – 2008
Jonathan Eyre BMus (Hons) ARCO ATCL 2008 – 2009
Christine Alp GRSM LRAM LGSM 2009–present

References

Anglican Diocese of Leeds
Church of England church buildings in North Yorkshire
Christ Church
Grade II listed churches in North Yorkshire